The 1972 Queen's Club Championships, also known by its sponsored name Rothmans London Grass Court Championships, was a combined men's and women's tennis tournament played on grass courts at the Queen's Club in London in the United Kingdom that was part of the 1972 Commercial Union Assurance Grand Prix and the 1972 Virginia Slims Circuit. The tournament was held from 19 June through  24 June 1972. In the semifinal of the men's singles event 44-year old Pancho Gonzales was leading by a set against John Paish when he was disqualified by the tournament referee after an argument over the replacement of a linesman. Jimmy Connors and Chris Evert won the singles titles.

Finals

Men's singles

 Jimmy Connors defeated  John Paish 6–2, 6–3
 It was Connors' 1st title of the year and the 1st of his career.

Women's singles
 Chris Evert defeated  Karen Krantzcke 6–4, 6–0
 It was Evert's 3rd title of the year and the 7th of her career.

Men's doubles

 Jim McManus /  Jim Osborne defeated  Jürgen Fassbender /  Karl Meiler 4–6, 6–3, 7–5
 It was McManus' 2nd title of the year and the 4th of his career. It was Osborne's 2nd title of the year and the 5th of his career.

Women's doubles
 Rosie Casals /  Billie Jean King defeated  Brenda Kirk /  Pat Walkden 5–7, 6–0, 6–2
 It was Casals' 4th title of the year and the 14th of her career. It was King's 3rd title of the year and the 37th of her career.

References

External links
 
 ATP tournament profile

 
Queen's Club Championships
Queen's Club Championships
Queen's Club Championships
Queen's Club Championships
Queen's Club Championships